Harry MacDonald (born September 27, 1940) is a retired Canadian racing driver. He raced in the UK Formula Super Vee series from 1977 to 1979 and in 1978 won a race at Texas World Speedway and finished third in the championship. In 1981 he attempted to qualify for the Indianapolis 500 but failed to do so, then competed in the USAC "Gold Crown" Championship Car race at Pocono Raceway where he finished 5th in a field of very few top drivers, then competed in the CART race at Michigan International Speedway and finished 21st after an engine failure.  He resurfaced in 1983 to attempt to qualify for the Indy 500 but again failed to do so.

MacDonald was born in Windsor, Ontario. He was a lawyer by trade and ran a law firm in his hometown of Bloomfield Hills, Michigan.

Racing record

SCCA National Championship Runoffs

Complete USAC Mini-Indy Series results

See also
List of Canadians in Champ Car

External links
ChampCarStats.com

1940 births
American sportspeople of Canadian descent
Champ Car drivers
Living people
Racing drivers from Ontario
Sportspeople from Windsor, Ontario
SCCA National Championship Runoffs winners
SCCA Formula Super Vee drivers